Sasha Bezuhanova is a Bulgarian public figure – business leader, investor and philanthropist with 20-years executive business career in HP and a multi-dimensional track record of service to society.

She is the founder and chairperson of MOVE.BG – a non-partisan platform for collaboration in finding sustainable solutions for the state, economy, and society via innovation, participation, and co-creation. Sasha is the initiator of Green Restart Coalition – a collaborative network for green innovation and policy agenda, EDIT.BG – open network initiative for digital innovation, as also The ChangeMakers – multidisciplinary community engagement initiative bridging digital, green, and art innovators.

During her business career, Bezuhanova had different roles. She was Director of Public Sector for the world Growth Markets at Hewlett-Packard. Previously she had managed the Central Eastern Europe Public sector business of the corporation. Before that Sasha was the General Manager of Hewlett-Packard Bulgaria for more than 10 years, positioning the company as the leader in the local ICT market and driving important investment in the country where HP employs today more than 7000 people.

Her long list of business achievements and social development engagements throughout the years involve positioning Bulgaria as an ICT center of global significance, boosting the entrepreneurial culture and women empowerment in her home country Bulgaria and at the European level.

Sasha is Chair of the Boards of WWF CEE and Bulgarian Center of Women in Technologies, co-founder and board member of the Digital Innovation Hub DigiTech 4.0 and Green Finance and Energy Center, a European Climate Pact Ambassador, and Advisor in GreenTech Alliance.

She is a former member of Governing board of the European Institute for Innovation and Technology (EIT) and an EIC Jury member. 

In 2013, she founded the yearly Entrepregirl Award for supporting young women to develop their entrepreneurial ideas into business.

Sasha is a mentor and angel investor in a number of technological and sustainability startups as also LP in three VC funds.

Bezuhanova is a regular public speaker on Bulgarian, European, and world forums on the topics of innovation, entrepreneurship, sustainability, women's leadership, and societal transformation in the digital era.

Sasha Bezuhanova was named Digital woman of Europe for 2013 and one of the Top 100 Challengers in New Europe 100 for 2015 and holds many other national and European awards for her contribution to social development.

She is an Honorary Consul of the Grand Duchy of Luxembourg to Bulgaria.

Sasha Bezuhanova holds an Executive Master’s Degree in International Negotiations and Policy Making from the Graduate Institute in Geneva, a Master's Degree in Electronics from the Technical University of Sofia, and Executive qualifications from INSEAD, Stanford, and others.

Sasha is married with one daughter.

Early life and education 

Sasha Bezuhanova was born in Pernik, Bulgaria. She graduated German language high school in Sofia.  Bezuhanova went on to study in Technical University in Sofia graduating with Masters in Electronics (1985). She holds also Executive master's degree in International Negotiations and Policy Making from the Graduate Institute in Geneva (2015) and has Executive qualifications from INSEAD and Stanford.

She attended special programs for studying the Irish economic model (Dublin, 2001), the structure of ICT sector in California (Palo Alto, 2002) and European Software Institute (Bilbao, 2003).

Aside from her native language Sasha Bezuhanova speaks English, German and Russian.

Career 

The professional career of Sasha Bezuhanova started in 1985 in the Central Institute for Computer Technologies where in 1986 she became Research Associate.

Shortly after the democratic changes in Bulgaria when the country opened up for direct presence of international businesses she was invited by the German medical concern HELLIGE to head their Bulgarian operation. Under her leadership in the period 1990 to 1994 the company played key role in the modernization of the Bulgarian health infrastructure.

Her international business and operational management experience evolved further as General Manager for S&T Bulgaria, the exclusive distributor of HP – a role she took over in 1995.

When HP decided to open up direct operation in Bulgaria in 1997 Bezuhanova was appointed as General Manager. Sasha Bezuhanova has managed Hewlett-Packard's business in Bulgaria for more than 10 years. In that period of time HP's Bulgarian team developed a series of IT infrastructure projects for the country's three biggest telecommunication companies, industrial manufacturers, and state and private finance institutions. Some of these projects have been implemented for the first time in Bulgaria and became reference solutions incorporated in the HP's portfolio. Among them was the implementation of electronic ID for Bulgarian citizens, which ended in August 1999 and was the key to Bulgaria's acceptance in the EU visa-free countries list in 2001. Another flagship project, that enriched the HP's worldwide practice, was the implementation of the Real-time gross settlement system (RTGS) in Macedonia.

Her most important accomplishment at the time was attracting an important investment of HP in Bulgaria where in 2006 started operation HP Global Delivery Centre. Today it employs more than 5000 high-profile engineers and specialists. That strategic project placed the country on the world IT investment map. As a result, Hewlett-Packard has become the largest IT employer in Bulgaria and the Top 5 in the country overall. Hewlett-Packard became also the largest investor and employer in the Bulgarian IT sector.

Sasha Bezuhanova continued her career in HP on international level being appointed in 2008 as Public Sector Director for Central Eastern Europe. She manages the corporation’s government business in 27 countries including Russia, New Europe, Western Balkans, and Central Asia bringing in an important strategic dimension and a holistic approach to this market segment.

In 2012 Bezuhanova was appointed as Director of Public Sector and Education for HP Growth Markets – a region including 67 countries around the world. As part of her business development responsibilities, she coordinated the company's relations with the EU, WB, and UN.

In 2013 when it became very critical in Bulgaria and the country was shaken by protests against the oligarchic establishment figures, Sasha Bezuhanova decided to leave her career and devote herself to the cause of positive change in Bulgaria. She founded the non-partisan organization MOVE.BG  – a platform for collaboration in finding sustainable solutions for the state, economy, and society via innovation, participation, and co-creation. MOVE.BG is affirming the culture of constructive dialog, participating leadership, democratic principles, and the European path of Bulgaria. Some of the programs are ‘Electoral reform’, ‘Media pluralism’, ‘Law and order in 5 steps’, "You move Europe’, ‘Solutions for Bulgaria: Digital’, ‘Solution for Bulgaria: Economics’  and the online platform ‘My Bulgarian History‘. In 2016, upon the initiative of Sasha Bezuhanova MOVE.BG together with key organizations, hubs, and companies developing digital knowledge and innovative business in Bulgaria, founded EDIT.BG (Economic Development via Innovation and Technologies) – an open network for digital development and innovation in Bulgaria. In 2018, Sasha inspired the foundation of the platform for collaboration and Changemakers, bringing together trendsetters with different professional backgrounds for exchange and joint action. In 2020, Bezuhanova initiated the establishment of the Green Restart Coalition bringing unprecedentedly together digital innovation and sustainability experts, scientists, and green activists for defining and driving a holistic green transformation agenda for Bulgaria. Some of the projects of the Coalition realized under the management of MOVE.BG are publishing the first "Textbook on the Future History of Bulgaria", the creation of the first metaverse-based ministry - the Ministry of Climate Transition and Green Transformation, publishing "Mission Green Bulgaria" - a report with more than 150 recommendations for supporting the sustainable development, publishing five opinion papers for improving the Bugarian National Recovery and Resilience Plan under the Next Generation EU.

Public contribution 

Alongside with MOVE.BG over the years Sasha Bezuhanova is actively engaged in the economic and social development of Bulgaria. She is part of many organizations and initiatives which work for positioning Bulgaria as an ICT center of global significance, for boosting the entrepreneurial culture and women empowerment in her home country Bulgaria and at the European level.

As a President of the Bulgarian International Business Association (BIBA) (2002-2006), in 2003, she initiates the development of the National ICT Competitiveness Strategy - a program that became a basis for a series of initiatives in the ICT sector in Bulgaria. She works actively for attracting foreign investments in the sector as also on the policy recommendation level in her capacity as chairperson of the Bulgarian ICT Cluster (2005 – 2006), founding Chairperson and a member of the Consultancy Committee of the Confederation of Industrialists and Employers in Bulgaria (CEIBG) (2007 - 2010), and member of the consultative body to Ministry of Economy for 3S strategy of Bulgaria (2011–2013).

As a chairperson of the board of Junior Achievement Bulgaria (1999 – 2014), Sasha Bezuhanova worked for developing entrepreneurial and leadership skills among young people. She contributes actively to another cause - the increase of women's leadership and professional participation in the ICT sector and science. She is a co-founder and chairperson of the Advisory Council of the European Centre of Women in Technology (ECWT) (2008 – 2019). In 2012, upon her initiative was founded the Bulgarian Centre of Women in Technology (BCWT) for fulfilling this mission in Bulgaria. In 2013, she founded the yearly Entrepregirl Award  for supporting young women to develop their entrepreneurial ideas into business.

Sasha is involved in numerous initiatives supporting the green transformation agenda. Key of them are Chairperson of WWF CEE, initiator of Green Restart Coalition, co-founder of Green Finance and Energy Center, European Climate Pact, and Advisor in GreenTech Alliance. 

She is a serial angel investor in technological and sustainability startups and a mentor of numerous innovative companies. 

Sasha is an active member in a number of Pan-European initiatives. Among them – European Climate Ambassador, the advisory board of the European Center of Women in Technologies, a member of Rising Tide Europe, and CEE Women in VC. She was the organizer of the Bulgarian stop of R&I tour d’Europe and was the local leader at ESIL initiative for empowering early-stage investors in Europe.

She is also a co-founder and board member of the Initiative for Social Empowerment – organization that aims to enable vulnerable groups of women and youth in Europe.

Membership on boards  

Chair of the Board of WWF CEE (2019 - present)
Co-founder and chair of the Bulgarian Centre of Women in Technology (BCWT) (2012–present)
Member of Governing Board of European Institute for Innovation and Technology (2018 – 2020)
Co-founder and board member of the Green Finance and Energy Center (2021 – present) 
Co-founder and board member of digital innovation hub DigiTech 4.0 (2017 - present)
Board member at Evrotrust Technology (2015 - present)
Board member at Cupffee (2019 - present)
Founding chair and currently board member of the Bulgarian ICT Cluster (2005 - present)
Member of the Honorary board of the Duke of Edinburgh's International Award (2014–present)
Co-founder and board member of the Initiative for Social Empowerment (ISE) (2015–2018)
Member of the board of "Bulgarian Charities Aid Foundation" BCAUSE (2011–2022)
Chair of the High-level Advisory Council of the European Centre of Women in Technology (ECWT) (2008–2019)
Chair of the board of Junior Achievement Bulgaria (1999 – 2014)
Chair of the Trustee board of Technical University in Sofia (2009–2017)
Member of the board of the American University (2005-2009)
Member of the Advisory board to the Minister of Education (2009 – 2010)
Member of the board of Open Society Foundation (2004–2010)
Member of the Management board of Sirma Group (2015–2020)
Chair and vice-chair of the Confederation of Employers and Industrials in Bulgaria (CEIBG) (2007–2010)
President of the Bulgarian International Business Association (BIBA) (2002–2006)

Awards and achievements 

For her achievements and contribution to the public development Sasha Bezuhanova has won many prestigious awards and honours:

 New Europe 100 Challenger for 2015   
 Digital Woman of Europe 2013 Award   
 #4 Most Influential Woman in Bulgaria (Top 100) for 2011.  
 International award for women leaders "LeaderShe" in 2010
 JA-YE (Junior Achievement-Young Enterprise Europe) "Leadership Award" for 2009 
 Business Face of Bulgaria Award for 2006, Financial Times  
 HP Worldwide Winners club (2006)  
 The Highest Reputation and Achievement in the Area of Corporate Management in Bulgaria (2003)  
 IT Manager of the year Award (2002; 2001; 1996), IDG Bulgaria  
 Business lady of the decade (1991–1999), IDG Bulgaria   
 Hewlett-Packard European Achievers Club (1999)  
 Best Young Manager in Bulgaria (1997), Evrika foundation  
 Best Sales Manager for East Central Europe (1993), HELLIGE  
 In 2009, Sasha Bezuhanova was awarded "Order of the Star of Italian Solidarity" - one of the highest orders in Italy, for her exclusive contribution to the development of bilateral economic relations between Bulgaria and Italy.

Consul 

Sasha Bezuhanova is the Honorary Consul of Grand Duchy of Luxembourg for Bulgaria.

Sources

External links 
 Sasha Bezuhanova featured in the Bulgarian edition of Forbes Magazine, issue 5, 2011, cover page, p.70-p.77
 Sasha Bezuhanova at The Brown Conference, 4-6 April, 2011 Dubrovnik Croatia
 Sasha Bezuhanova about anti-government protests in Bulgaria in front of Reuters, 1 August, 2013 
 Sasha Bezuhanova for Bulgaria's middle-class rebels press for a ‘normal’ EU state in front of Euractive, 2 August, 2013
 Sasha Bezuhanova presents MoveBG - online platform for debates about modern national policies in front of Dnevnik online, 12 August, 2013
 Sasha Bezuhanova for the past 2014 year and the challenges of the forthcoming 2015
 Commenting article: Sasha Bezuhanova - Business with a Feminine Touch
 Women in the IT business will increase EU GDP by 9 billion euro, GR Reporter, 2014
 First Ada Award Winners Celebrated at ICT 2013
 Digital Woman, Girls of the Year named at ICT 2013
 EIGE Women and men inspiring Europe: Sasha Bezuhanova 
 Sasha Bezuhanova: Women in Technology Are the Professionals of the Future
 Sasha Bezuhanova: "The leader is a free man, who is responsible for his actions and in front of the society’
 Business executive Sasha Bezuhanova chats with her colleagues in her office in Sofia
 Successful role model from Bulgaria: Sasha Bezuhanova – a leader in European business
 Sasha Bezuhanova, Head of HP's strategic division for collaboration with the public sector on emerging markets: More flexibility of fiscal incentives is needed in order to attract investors, 2012
 Editing Bulgaria digitally, NE100 Team 2016
 "The awakening we're collectively experiencing" by Sasha Bezuhanova, founder of Move.BG; NE100 2016
 SIStory | Sasha Bezuhanova: Freedom of Dreams, Start it Smart 2014
 Bulgaria builds on legacy of female engineering elite, Financial Times 2018

Living people
Technical University, Sofia alumni
Hewlett-Packard people
People from Pernik
INSEAD alumni
Graduate Institute of International and Development Studies alumni
Bulgarian women in business
Bulgarian expatriates in Switzerland
1962 births